Israeli Americans (or ) are Americans who are of full or partial Israeli descent. In this category are those who are Israelis through nationality and/or citizenship. Reflecting Israel's demographics, while the vast majority of the Israeli American populace is Jewish, it is also made up of various ethnic and religious minorities; most notably the ethnic Arab minority, which includes Muslims, Christians, and the Druze, as well as the smaller non-Arab minority ethnic groups.

History
Israelis began migrating to the United States shortly after the establishment of the State of Israel in May 1948. Thus, during the 1950s, 21,376 Israeli immigrants came to the US and the 1960s saw 30,911 Israeli immigrants, often seen as the first wave of Israeli immigration to the United States when 52,278 Israelis emigrated to the US according to US Immigration data. A second wave of modest immigration continued with a total of  36,306 Israelis during 1970 to 1979, 43,669 in 1980 to 1989, 41,340 in 1990 to 1999 and 54,801 in 2000 to 2009. Since 2010, Israeli migration to the US has continued at around four thousand per year. The number of immigrants in the United States born in Israel is estimated by demographers to be close to 140,000, while the number of Israeli immigrants in the US is an issue that has been debated by laymen to be much larger, a phenomenon of overestimation of co-ethnic population common to many ethnic communities.

Israeli immigration to the United States developed during the 1980s and 1990s due to a number of reasons, including continuing conflict with the Palestinians and high taxes and lack of affordable housing available in their homeland. Also, the acquisition of aspects of American culture (especially fashion and entertainment) in Israel caused many Israelis to want to have the economic and educational opportunities of the United States.

Demographics
Since the declaration of the State of Israel, and until today, many Israelis emigrated to the United States. The 2000 United States census estimated that nearly 110,000 Israelis lived in the United States back then, while other unsourced estimates say the number is much higher, around 500,000. A considerable numbers of Israelis, estimated broadly from 200,000 to three times that figure, have moved abroad in the recent decades (Yerida).

According to statistics from the United States Department of Homeland Security, between 1949 and 2015, about 250,000 Israelis acquired permanent residency in the United States. The statistics did not track those who eventually moved back to Israel. In 2012, a Global Religion and Migration Database constructed by the Pew Research Center showed that there were a total of 330,000 native-born Israelis, including 230,000 Jews, living outside of Israel, in the United States and elsewhere around the world, approximately 4% of Israel's native-born Jewish population. Based on current estimates of Israel-born Jewish migrants to the U.S. of 140,000, two thirds of Jewish Israeli native emigrants have settled in the U.S. and the remaining third in Canada, Europe, South America, South Africa and the remainder of the world.

In addition to native-born Israelis and Israelis who originally immigrated to Israel from other countries and then moved on to the United States, there have been American Jews who immigrated to Israel and became Israeli citizens, lived there for a certain period of time, and later returned to the United States. Israeli demographer Yinon Cohen estimated the number of American-born Israelis who had returned to the United States to be between 30,000 and 60,000 by 1990, and between 53,000 and 75,000 in 2000.

The Organisation for Economic Co-operation and Development calculated an 'expatriate rate' of 2.9 persons per thousand, putting Israel in the mid-range of expatriate rates among the 175 OECD countries examined in 2005.

The New York City metropolitan area has now become by far the leading metropolitan gateway for Israeli immigrants legally admitted into the United States, with the Los Angeles metropolitan area now in a distant second place. Within the United States, as of April 2013, Israeli airline El Al operated from John F. Kennedy International Airport and Newark Liberty International Airport, both in the New York City metropolitan area, as well as from Los Angeles International Airport. The New York City metropolitan area is home to the largest Jewish community outside Israel, and the city proper contains the largest Jewish community in the world.

In 2009, Steven M. Cohen and Judith Veinstein found that in New York, Jewish Israeli emigrants are highly affiliated with the Jewish community even though community affiliation is low in Israel. Israelis were found to be more connected to Judaism than their American counterparts in terms of synagogue membership and attendance, kashrut observance, participation in Jewish charity events and membership in Jewish community centers, among other indicators used by the study.

In 1982, Pini Herman and David LaFontaine, in a study of Israeli emigrants in Los Angeles, found high levels of Jewish affiliation, Jewish organizational participation and concentration in Jewish neighborhoods by Israeli emigrants. Israeli emigrants who behaved in a comparatively secular manner in Israel tended to behave in a more devoutly Jewish manner in Los Angeles and Israeli emigrants who reported greater Jewish behaviors in Israel tended to engage in Jewish behaviors to a lesser degree in Los Angeles, thus both becoming more 'Americanized' in their Jewish behaviors.

Israelis tend to be disproportionately Jewishly active in their diaspora communities, creating and participating formal and informal organizations, participating in diaspora Jewish religious institutions and sending their children to Jewish education providers at a greater rate than local diaspora Jews.

By generations
Based on the 2013 Pew American Jewry Survey estimate base on Jews by religion/no religion/Jewish background who were born in Israel is 140,000 nationally. American Jews born in Israel had 40 thousand children under age 18 in their US households. Another estimated 170 thousand Jewish adults not born in Israel have at least one parent born in Israel, and these adults have an estimated 200 thousand children under the age of 18 who have at least one Israel-born grandparent. An additional 60 thousand American Jews reported that they had once "lived in Israel."

By state
The U.S. states by Israeli Americans as per the 2000 census:

Culture and organizations
Various Israeli-American communities have their own newspapers which are printed in Hebrew. Communities arrange cultural, entertainment and art events (including celebrations of the Israeli independence day which usually takes place in Israeli-American demographic centers), and some have the Israeli Network channel, which consists of a selection of live broadcasts as well as reruns of Israeli television news broadcasts, entertainment programs and Israeli sport events. Hundreds of thousands of spectators view the annual Celebrate Israel Parade on Fifth Avenue in Manhattan, which touts itself as the world's largest celebration of Israel. At the 2017 Celebrate Israel parade in Manhattan, New York Governor Andrew Cuomo declared the Sunday Shimon Peres Day in New York and announced a new venture to promote cultural heritage tourism between Israel and New York, as Cuomo marched alongside the son of the late Israeli leader.

A variety of Hebrew language websites, newspapers and magazines are published in New York, Los Angeles, South Florida, and other U.S. regions. The Israeli Channel along with two other Hebrew-language channels are available via satellite broadcast nationally in the United States. Hebrew language Israeli programming on local television was broadcast in New York and Los Angeles during the 1990s, prior to Hebrew language satellite broadcast. Live performances by Israeli artists are a regular occurrence in centers of Israeli emigrants in the U.S. and Canada with audience attendance often in the hundreds. An Israeli Independence Day Festival has taken place yearly in Los Angeles since 1990 with thousands of Israeli emigrants and American Jews.

In Los Angeles, a Council of Israeli Community was founded in 2001. In 2007, an Israel Leadership Council (ILC) was also organized in Los Angeles, later it was renamed Israeli-American Council, and it has been active in supporting activities for Israel, most recently in 2008, it sponsored with the local Jewish Federation and Israeli consulate a concert in support for the embattled population suffering rocket attacks of Sderot, Israel where the three frontrunners for the U.S. president, Hillary Clinton, Barack Obama, John McCain greeted the attendees by video and expressed their support for the residents of Sderot. An Israeli Business Network of Beverly Hills has existed since 1996. The Israeli-American Study Initiative (IASI), a start-up project based at the UCLA International Institute, is set out to document the lives and times of Israeli Americans—initially focusing on those in Los Angeles and eventually throughout the United States.

Economic contributions
According to CNN, Israeli companies are establishing entrepreneurial ventures in New York City at the rate of ten new startups per month. In 2022, there were 293 Israeli startups in the New York area, the most of any metropolitan area outside Tel Aviv and Jerusalem.

Relationship with American Jews
Israeli Americans are generally seen as having less interaction with the non-Israeli Jewish American community and its institutions, often preferring to maintain ties of association with other Israeli Americans. Jewish Americans, especially religious Jewish Americans, tend to maintain correspondingly sparse contact with the Israeli American community besides participation in religious ceremonies. At one point, religious American Jews viewed "yordim" as being the antithesis of the Jewish people's "eternal hope" of return and permanent settlement in Israel, but now consider them an important subgroup within the broader American Jewish community. An estimated 75% of Israeli Americans marry within the Jewish community, as opposed to about 50% of non-Israeli Jewish Americans. At the same time, younger Israelis in America are assimilating in increasing numbers.

Notable people

In popular culture
 Comedian-writer Robert Smigel came up with a Saturday Night Live sketch in 1990 called the "Sabra Shopping Network". Two years later, Smigel followed it up with "Sabra Price Is Right", starring Tom Hanks as a pushy Israeli game show host, Sandler and Rob Schneider as its presenters and Smigel as a cigarette-smoking announcer, all pushing shoddy electronics on hapless clientele.
 The concept for the 2008 You Don't Mess with the Zohan movie, which was based on the skits "Sabra Shopping Network" and "Sabra Price Is Right", focused on Zohan Dvir, an IDF commando soldier, who stages his own death to fulfill his deepest dream—moving to New York to become a hairdresser.
 At the end of the 2005 film Munich, the main character Avner (played by Eric Bana), who is an Israeli Mossad agent, decides to move from Israel to Brooklyn, New York, to reunite with his wife and their child.

See also

 Yerida
 Israelis
 Israeli Australians
 Israeli Canadians
 Israeli British
 History of Israelis in Los Angeles
 Middle Eastern Americans
 Israel–United States relations
 History of Jews in Latin America and the Caribbean

References

Further reading
 Cohen, Nir. "State, Migrants, and the Negotiation of Second-Generation Citizenship in the Israeli Diaspora." Diaspora: A Journal of Transnational Studies 16.2 (2007): 133-158. online
 Cohen, Yinon. “Socioeconomic Dualism: The Case of Israeli-Born Immigrants in the United States.” International Migration Review 23 (1989): 267–88.
 Gold, Steven J. “Israeli Immigrants in the United States: The Question of Community.” Qualitative Sociology 17 (1994): 325–45.
 Gold, Steven J. "Gender and social capital among Israeli immigrants in Los Angeles." Diaspora: A Journal of Transnational Studies 4.3 (1995): 267-301. excerpt
 Rosenthal, Mirra, and Charles Auerbach. “Cultural and Social Assimilation of Israeli Immigrants in the United States.” International Migration Review 26, no. 3 (Fall 1992): 982–91.
 Rudolph, Laura C. "Israeli Americans." Gale Encyclopedia of Multicultural America, edited by Thomas Riggs, (3rd ed., vol. 2, Gale, 2014), pp. 493–503. online

 
Middle Eastern American
United States
Immigration to the United States
Multiracial ethnic groups in the United States